Baleno is a name for:

 Baleno (Hong Kong), clothing retailer
 Baleno, Masbate, municipality in the Philippines
 Suzuki Baleno, car

See also
Balerno